Goran Gavrilović (born 16 July 1963) is a Serbian former footballer who played as a goalkeeper. He has also worked as a goalkeeping coach for Hajduk Beograd and Radnički Zrenjanin.

Career
After coming through the youth system at Partizan, Gavrilović played for five seasons with Radnički Niš in the Yugoslav First League (1983–1988), making 40 appearances. He also appeared once in the 1983–84 UEFA Cup, keeping a clean sheet in a 3–0 home win over St. Gallen.

In the summer of 1988, Gavrilović switched to Yugoslav Second League side Proleter Zrenjanin. He helped them win promotion to the Yugoslav First League in his debut season. During his four-year stay at the club (1988–1992), Gavrilović collected 114 league appearances.

Following the breakup of Yugoslavia, Gavrilović moved abroad to Turkey and joined Gençlerbirliği, making 18 appearances in the 1992–93 1.Lig. He subsequently returned to Proleter Zrenjanin for one season (1993–94), before switching to Borac Čačak. In 1995, Gavrilović rejoined Proleter Zrenjanin for a third stint.

References

External links
 
 
 
 

Association football goalkeepers
Expatriate footballers in Turkey
First League of Serbia and Montenegro players
FK Beograd players
FK Borac Čačak players
FK Partizan players
FK Proleter Zrenjanin players
FK Radnički Niš players
Gençlerbirliği S.K. footballers
Serbia and Montenegro expatriate footballers
Serbia and Montenegro expatriate sportspeople in Turkey
Serbia and Montenegro footballers
Serbian footballers
Süper Lig players
Yugoslav First League players
Yugoslav footballers
Yugoslav Second League players
1963 births
Living people